Chelsea is an unincorporated census-designated place located in the town of Chelsea, Taylor County, Wisconsin, United States. As of the 2010 census, its population is 113.

References

Census-designated places in Taylor County, Wisconsin
Census-designated places in Wisconsin